Wetalth Ridge is an isolated ridge in northern British Columbia, Canada, located  southwest of Tatogga and south of Telegraph Creek. It lies on the southwest side of Little Arctic Lake at the southwest corner of Mount Edziza Provincial Park.

History
Wetalth Ridge was named on January 2, 1980 by the Geological Survey of Canada to recall a small group of wandering and exploited outcasts from the Tahltans called "Wetalth" people.

Geology
Wetalth Ridge is a volcanic feature associated with the Mount Edziza volcanic complex which in turn forms part of the Northern Cordilleran Volcanic Province. It is a subglacial mound that formed in the Pleistocene epoch when this area was buried beneath glacial ice during the last ice age.

See also
 List of volcanoes in Canada
 List of Northern Cordilleran volcanoes
 Volcanism of Canada
 Volcanism of Western Canada

References

External links
 Wetalth Ridge in the Canadian Mountain Encyclopedia

Subglacial mounds of Canada
Pleistocene volcanoes
Mount Edziza volcanic complex
Ridges of British Columbia
Ridges of Canada
One-thousanders of British Columbia